Roy Howard Beck is an American author, as well as the founder and president of the anti-immigration advocacy organization NumbersUSA. He is former Washington, DC bureau chief of Booth Newspapers and an environment-beat newspaper reporter, formerly with The Grand Rapids Press and The Cincinnati Enquirer. Beck was also the Washington, DC editor of John Tanton's white nationalist magazine The Social Contract.

Career 
Beck is a graduate of the University of Missouri School of Journalism. He was raised in Marshfield, Missouri and delivered milk and collected cans for pocket money in his youth. During the late 1960s, Beck worked at The Grand Rapids Press and The Cincinnati Enquirer as an environmental journalist. He has claimed that the consequences of population growth on natural resources which became a concern during the 1960s environmental movement led to his interest in immigration. Beck worked as the Washington editor of  Social Contract Press, which has been designated as a hate group by the Southern Poverty Law Center.

He left journalism during the 1990s and founded NumbersUSA. Beck has gained notable attention in 1996 via a disputed presentation recorded on a VHS tape where he used gumballs to show that immigration to the United States did not alleviate world poverty, because so many remained impoverished outside of the United States. The conclusion was that the United States should restrict immigration more and help the impoverished where they are, instead of allowing them to migrate to richer countries. David R. Henderson, an economist at Stanford University's Hoover Institution and the Naval Postgraduate School in Monterey, California, noted that Beck makes it seem as if allowing immigration is done at a cost to Americans, but that is not what research on the issue indicates. That same year, Beck authored the book The Case Against Immigration which was released in the lead-up to the 1996 elections in the United States.

The New York Times credited Beck's NumbersUSA organization with applying enough pressure to U.S. Senators to defeat a comprehensive immigration bill in June 2007. He has been described as a "tutor" for U.S. Representative Tom Tancredo on immigration issues. According to The Washington Post, Beck had "been marginalized in Washington as an eccentric figure." He released Back of the Hiring Line in 2021 which focused on if American institutions owe U.S. citizens.

Bibliography

References

External links
 Biography at NumbersUSA
 Biography at Sprawl City
 The Case Against Immigration by Roy Beck
 Re-Charting America's Future by Roy Beck
 Immigration, World Poverty and Gumballs Video
 Yale Global: With Little Notice, Globalization Reduced Poverty
 

Living people
American non-fiction environmental writers
American conservationists
Anti-immigration activists
American activist journalists
University of Missouri alumni
The Cincinnati Enquirer people
People from Marshfield, Missouri
1948 births